The 1979 FINA Women's Water Polo World Cup was the first edition of the event, organised by the world's governing body in aquatics, the International Swimming Federation (FINA). The event took place in Merced, United States, from June 29 to July 1, 1979. The five participating teams played a round robin to decide the first ever winner of the event.

Results Matrix

Final standings

Final ranking

References

FINA Women's Water Polo World Cup
F
W
International water polo competitions hosted by the United States
Women's water polo in the United States
1979 in sports in California
June 1979 sports events in the United States
July 1979 sports events in the United States